Norman Granz (August 6, 1918 – November 22, 2001) was an American jazz record producer and concert promoter. He founded the record labels Clef, Norgran, Down Home, Verve, and Pablo. Granz was acknowledged as "the most successful impresario in the history of jazz". He was also a champion of racial equality, insisting, for example, on integrating audiences at concerts he promoted.

Biography
Born in Boyle Heights, Los Angeles, Granz was the son of Jewish immigrants from Tiraspol. After school, he began work as a stock clerk on the Los Angeles stock exchange. When America joined the Second World War, he was drafted into the U.S. Army Air Force. Subsequently, he was posted to the Morale branch, the department charged with troops' entertainment.
 
He then emerged into the public view when he organised desegregated jam sessions at the Trouville Club in Los Angeles, which he later expanded when he staged a memorable concert at the Philharmonic Auditorium in Los Angeles on Sunday, July 2, 1944, under the heading of "Jazz at the Philharmonic".

The title of the concert, "A Jazz Concert at the Philharmonic Auditorium", had been shortened by the printer of the advertising supplements to "Jazz at the Philharmonic". Only one copy of the very first concert program is known to exist. Norman Granz had organised the first Jazz at the Philharmonic concert with about $300 of borrowed money. Later known as JATP, the ever-changing group recorded and toured extensively, with Granz producing some of the first live jam session recordings to be distributed to a wide market.

After several JATP concerts in Los Angeles in 1944 and 1945, Granz began producing JATP concert tours, from late fall of 1945 to 1957 in USA and Canada, and from 1952 in Europe. They featured swing and bop musicians and were among the first high-profile performances to feature racially integrated bands. Granz actually cancelled some bookings rather than have the musicians perform for segregated audiences. He recorded many of the JATP concerts, and from 1945 to 1947 sold/leased the recordings to Asch/Disc/Stinson Records (record producer Moses Asch's labels).

In 1948, Granz signed an agreement with Mercury Records for the promotion and the distribution of the JATP recordings and other recordings. After the agreement expired in 1953 he issued the JATP recordings and other recordings on Clef Records (founded 1946) and Norgran Records (founded 1953). Down Home Records was intended for traditional jazz works. Jazz at the Philharmonic ceased touring the United States and Canada, after the JATP concerts in the fall of 1957, apart from a North American Tour in 1967.

Personal life
Granz married three times. In 1950, he married Loretta (née Snyder) Sullivan from Michigan; they had a daughter together, Stormont Granz, who was disabled due to lack of oxygen during the birth. Loretta was previously married and had a child, Sydney Sullivan Hamed, whom Granz adopted. They separated in 1953 and divorced in 1955. In 1965, he married Hannelore Granz, a former airline stewardess from Germany. In 1974, he married Grete Lyngby from Denmark.

Granz died of cancer on November 22, 2001, at the age of 83, in Geneva, Switzerland.

Recordings
Many of the names that made history in jazz signed with one of Norman Granz's labels, including Louis Armstrong, Ella Fitzgerald, Count Basie, Mort Sahl, Louie Bellson,  Benny Carter, Buck Clayton, Buddy DeFranco, Roy Eldridge, Herb Ellis, Tal Farlow, Stan Getz, Dizzy Gillespie, Lionel Hampton, Coleman Hawkins, Johnny Hodges, Billie Holiday, Illinois Jacquet, Hank Jones, Gene Krupa, Anita O'Day (the first artist to sign with Verve), Charlie Parker, Joe Pass, Oscar Peterson, Flip Phillips, Bud Powell, Buddy Rich, Sonny Stitt, Slim Gaillard, Art Tatum, Ben Webster and Lester Young.

Granz saw to it that his musicians were well paid. In the segregated society of the 1940s, he insisted on equal pay and accommodation for white and black musicians. He refused to take his hugely popular concerts to places which were segregated, even if he had to cancel concerts, thereby sacrificing considerable sums of money.

In 1944, Granz and Gjon Mili produced the jazz film Jammin' the Blues, which starred Lester Young, Illinois Jacquet, Barney Kessel, Harry Edison, Jo Jones, Sidney Catlett, Marlowe Morris, and Marie Bryant, and was nominated for an Academy Award.

It was in 1956 that the popular singer Ella Fitzgerald finally joined Norman Granz's label. Granz had been her manager for some time, and unified his activities under the common label of Verve Records. Granz became Fitzgerald's manager, and remained so until the end of her career. Fitzgerald's memorable series of eight Songbooks, together with the duet series (notably Armstrong-Peterson, Fitzgerald-Basie, Fitzgerald-Pass and Getz-Peterson) achieved wide popularity and brought acclaim to the label and to the artists. Granz was also the manager of Oscar Peterson,  another lifelong friend.

In 1959, Norman Granz moved to Switzerland. In December 1960, Verve Records was sold to Metro-Goldwyn-Mayer.

Granz founded his last label, Pablo Records, in 1973; in 1987, he sold it to Fantasy Records.

Opposing racism
Norman Granz opposed racism and fought many battles for his artists, many of whom were black. In 1955, in Houston, Texas, he removed signs that previously designated "White" and "Negro" restrooms, outside the auditorium where two concerts were to be performed by Ella Fitzgerald and Dizzy Gillespie. Between the two shows, Fitzgerald and Gillespie and Illinois Jacquet were shooting small-stakes dice in the dressing room to kill time, when the local police barged in and arrested them. After some negotiations, the artists were allowed to perform the second show and later were formally released on $50 bail. Granz, incensed by the incident, insisted on successfully fighting the charges, which cost him over $2,000.

Oscar Peterson recounted how Granz once insisted that white cabdrivers take his black artists as customers, while a policeman pointed a loaded pistol at his stomach. Granz also was among the first to pay white and black artists the same salary, and to give them equal treatment even in minor details, such as dressing rooms.

Granz also spearheaded the fight to desegregate the hotels and casinos in Las Vegas, arguing that it was unfair that black artists could perform on the stages, but could not stay or gamble at the hotels, or even enter through the front doors.

Granz was also interested in art, developing a friendship with Pablo Picasso, whom he met in 1968.

See also
 :Category:Albums produced by Norman Granz

References

External links
 The Ella Fitzgerald Charitable Foundation
 Obituary at jazzhouse.org
 

1918 births
2001 deaths
Activists for African-American civil rights
American music industry executives
American people of Ukrainian-Jewish descent
Record producers from California
Ella Fitzgerald
Impresarios
Jazz record producers
Jewish American musicians
Musicians from Los Angeles
Music promoters
Jewish jazz musicians
United States Army Air Forces personnel of World War II